The 54th Annual Country Music Association Awards were held on Wednesday, November 11, 2020, at the Music City Center in Nashville, Tennessee and was hosted by CMA Award winners Darius Rucker and Reba McEntire.

Background 
Darius Rucker is the second African-American male to co-host the award show after Charley Pride, who co-hosted the 1975 ceremony.

On October 22, the CMA announced that trailblazing country star Charley Pride would be the recipient of the 2020 Willie Nelson Lifetime Achievement Award. It would be Pride's last public appearance before his death that December.

On November 9, following the announcement that two of the artists (Lee Brice and Tyler Hubbard of Florida Georgia Line) originally scheduled to perform on the CMA Awards had tested positive for coronavirus, the CMA released a statement to Entertainment Tonight explaining that "We have been extremely diligent with our testing process in advance of anyone entering our footprint.  Every single person has been tested, and many will be tested repeatedly throughout the week.  This is in addition to wearing PPE and of course practicing social and physical distancing. We have an incredible show planned and look forward to bringing the country music community together. However, our number one priority has been and will continue to be the safety of our artists, our crew and our staff.  That will never be compromised."

In order to mitigate the likelihood of spreading coronavirus during the ceremony, only the nominees, their staff, guests and the crew were allowed into the venue and the traditional red carpet did not take place. Longtime CMA producer Roger Deaton confirmed to The Tennessean that the show would incorporate both live and pre-recorded performances (with around 60% being performed live) and that multiple stages throughout the venue would be utilized in order to account for how each stage must be fully cleaned and sanitized by crew members following a performance, taking about fifteen to twenty minutes. Seating arrangements for the attendees were designed to strictly adhere to social distancing guidelines, with a banquet-style layout akin to the inaugural untelevised CMA Awards wherein an artist and their guests each have their own table which is spaced eight meters apart from the other tables. After Charley Pride's death, speculation arose that he may have caught the virus from an asymptomatic carrier at the ceremony who had gone undetected.

Winners and nominees 
The nominees were announced on September 1, 2020 by Luke Combs and Carly Pearce on Good Morning America as well as by Ingrid Andress and Gabby Barrett on the CMA YouTube channel. The eligibility period for the 54th CMA Awards was from July 1, 2019 to June 30, 2020.

Winners in Bold.

International Awards

Performers
The first wave of performers were announced on October 29, 2020, followed by the second wave on November 5.

Artists test positive for COVID-19 
On November 8, 2020, Lee Brice was forced to pull out of performing his multi-nominated song "I Hope You're Happy Now" with Carly Pearce after testing positive for coronavirus. Charles Kelley from Lady A was later announced to be performing Brice's part alongside Pearce. On November 9, Tyler Hubbard of Florida Georgia Line revealed that he had also tested positive, resulting in the duo's performance of "Long Live" being cancelled, with their slot being given to Kelsea Ballerini who was originally not scheduled to appear. Both Brice and Hubbard received their positive test results before entering CMA rehearsals. Jenee Fleenor also tested positive for COVID-19 and her part in the Charlie Daniels tribute was given to Dan Hochhalter, the fiddle player in Dierks Bentley's band. Ahead of the awards, Lady A announced that, while the band themselves had all tested negative, a member of their immediate family had tested positive and they had made the decision not to attend the show, therefore not appearing alongside Thomas Rhett and Darius Rucker as planned. Kelley's performance with Pearce had been pre-recorded and aired as part of the show. Rascal Flatts also did not perform "Bless the Broken Road" after member of the band tested positive.

Charley Pride later tested positive after the show, an infection that later proved fatal. It is under investigation how Pride caught the virus.

Presenters

CeCe Winans introduced Darius Rucker & Reba McEntire's performance.

Nominee milestones
Courtesy of Billboard.
 As the top nominee with seven nods, Miranda Lambert overtakes Reba McEntire as the most nominated woman in CMA history, with 55 total nominations to McEntire's 51. Lambert is now the fourth most-nominated artist behind Brad Paisley (58), Alan Jackson (81) and George Strait (83).
 Additionally, with Lambert's nominations for Album, Single and Song of the Year, she matches Jackson (1990, 1991, 1993 and 2002) as the only artist in CMA history to be nominated in all three categories four times (after previously sweeping the categories in 2010, 2014 and 2017). She also ties Paisley as the second most-nominated artist in the Single of the Year category with 8 nominations behind Strait's nine.
 Keith Urban's Entertainer of the Year nod brings his career total to 13 nominations, second only to Strait's 19.
 Lambert and Underwood's nominations for Entertainer of the Year marks the first time that two women have been nominated in the category at the same time since 1979 when Crystal Gayle and Barbara Mandrell were nominated. It is also worth noting that Faith Hill and the Dixie Chicks were both nominated in 2000, but Lambert and Underwood is the first time that two solo women have been nominated since Gayle and Mandrell.
 Lambert, Morris and Barrett's nominations for Single of the Year also mark the first time three women have been nominated in the category since 1994 when Mary Chapin Carpenter, Patty Loveless and Reba McEntire were all featured.
 Andress, Barrett and Pearce's nominations for New Artist of the Year mark the first time three female artists have been nominated in the category since 1999 when Sara Evans,  Chely Wright and eventual winner Jo Dee Messina were nominated. Additionally, Jimmie Allen's nomination in the category is the first for an African American artist since Darius Rucker won in 2009.
 Brooks & Dunn's 21'st Vocal Duo of the Year nomination extends their lead as the highest nominated act in that category.
 For the first time since the 1977 CMA Awards, all five Single of the Year nominees reached the top thirty on the all-genre Billboard Hot 100 chart.
 "10,000 Hours" is the fourth collaboration with a pop star to be nominated for Single of the Year, following Willie Nelson and Julio Iglesias' "To All the Girls I've Loved Before", Jason Aldean and Kelly Clarkson's "Don't You Wanna Stay" and Bebe Rexha and Florida Georgia Line's "Meant to Be".

Controversies

Garth Brooks 
On July 30, 2020, Garth Brooks announced that he wants his name to be permanently out of contention for Entertainer of the Year. After he won the 2019 Entertainer of the Year award, it caused a social media firestorm; many fans and artists believed Carrie Underwood or Eric Church deserved to win the award over Brooks. Brooks stated that after the last win, that it was "not that fun, to tell you the truth." As he absorbed the backlash after the November awards show, Brooks said, he couldn't shake the sentiment expressed in one of the tweets he read: "It said, 'Hey man, this guy, why doesn't he step down and just [leave] the entertainer for the next generation?'" He said he realized that taking his name out of the running was his only way forward. The timing of his announcement came just two days before the second round of voting begins for the annual awards, "I'm very grateful for the time that I've got to go [win]," he said, but now, "somebody else needs to hold that." According to a statement released July 30, 2020 by the Country Music Association, "The long-standing CMA Awards rules do not allow individuals to remove themselves from the balloting process at any point."

In 2021, Brooks restated that his position on receiving a nomination for Entertainer of the Year still stands.

CMA Messaging 
Singer Margo Price was critical of the awards after the CMA released a statement stating that the show would feature "no drama, just music" promising to help the audience "forget the weight of the world for just a little while". Price tweeted her anger stating that "once again, the CMA’s are censoring/white washing their show but who’s surprised? anyone still participating is a socially unconscious pawn. Artists pander woke authenticity when it benefits them and then sit in silence as they collect their plastic trophies. Also the music sucks". She additionally criticized the lack of diversity as "appalling" and the fact that the event included a live audience by stating that "covid cases are at an all time high and the CMA’s are holding an event INSIDE where they censor what you talk about if it doesn’t fit their narrative". Many articles however pointed out that the CMA's statement did not mention anywhere that they would censor artists and was simply a piece of promotion and was not, in fact, directed towards the artists or performers at all. The CMA released a response to the criticism stating that: “we look forward to an evening of incredible music and celebration at next week’s CMA Awards. While our intentions with our social campaign was to communicate to our fans that the show will offer a brief escape, we recognize that our phrasing did not convey that message. We welcome every artist’s right to express themselves.”.

John Prine 
After airing, the CMA Awards received criticism from artists Sturgill Simpson, Jason Isbell and Amanda Shires for failing to mention John Prine who had passed away in April following complications from COVID-19 as well as Billy Joe Shaver and Jerry Jeff Walker who both died in October, with Isbell noting that he and Shires had returned their CMA membership cards in protest. A statement from Prine's label Oh Boy Records read "we're disappointed John won't be a part of the CMA award show tonight. Country music was both the inspiration and foundation for his songwriting and performing. While there may be a number of artists who have had more commercial success than John, there are very few who achieved more artistically".

The Death of Charley Pride 
Charley Pride, the 86 year old recipient of the 54th CMA's Lifetime Achievement Award, died on December 12, just weeks after attending the ceremony in what would be his final public appearance. A statement released by Pride's family explained that the star had died of complications from COVID-19 which launched speculation that he may have caught it at the ceremony, with several stars including Maren Morris, Brandi Carlile, Rissi Palmer and Mickey Guyton demanding answers from the CMAs. A joint statement released by the CMA and Pride's representatives stated "Charley was tested prior to traveling to Nashville. He was tested upon landing in Nashville, and again on show day, with all tests coming back negative. After returning to Texas following the CMA Awards, Charley again tested negative multiple times. All of us in the Country Music community are heartbroken by Charley’s passing. Out of respect for his family during their grieving period, we will not be commenting on this further." While it was noted that Pride was the only attendee to test positive following the awards and that he made the decision to attend in-person and accept his award, the controversy persisted, Pride's longtime manager and bass player Kevin Bailey released a statement defending the CMAs explaining that "U do know that Charley tested negative twice after he came back from Nashville, and it may have even been three times. My understanding is that when Charley went into the hospital, we thought he had pneumonia. Somebody decided to do another test, and then they put him in the COVID unit. Every precaution was taken. I think it’s unfortunate that people are out there crusading to stir up some mud. Because I really don’t think the CMAs were negligent in any way. Every time we darkened the door, we got tested."

References 

Country Music Association
CMA
Country Music Association Awards
Country Music Association Awards
November 2020 events in the United States
2020 awards in the United States
21st century in Nashville, Tennessee
Events in Nashville, Tennessee
Country Music Association Awards